Jiyeon is a South Korean singer-songwriter and rapper. Her discography currently consists of 2 extended plays, 6 singles and 5 soundtrack appearances.

Extended plays

Singles

Promotional singles

Soundtracks

Other charted songs

Other appearances

References 

Discographies of South Korean artists